Emo (from the ) is a village in County Laois, Ireland. It is located near Portlaoise on the R422 regional road just off the M7 Dublin–Limerick motorway.

History
The late 18th century village of Emo originally developed around the gates of Emo Court. The village pub, the New Inn (now called the "Gate House"), dates from the village's foundation, as does the Gothic Catholic Church, which contains the tomb of Aline, Lady Portarlington, with its recumbent effigy by Joseph Boehm. The site for the church was a gift from Lord Portarlington, and the parochial house and lands beside the church were granted by the Earl of Portarlington at a nominal rent.

Emo Court was designed in 1790 by architect James Gandon for the first Earl of Portarlington and is a well-known example of the neoclassical style.

There is a namesake town in Ontario named after this village by an Irish immigrant from the area.

Sport
Emo GAA is the local Gaelic Athletic Association club.

Oil
The Emo Oil Company is based in Portlaoise and named after the village. The brand is used by several divisions of DCC Plca and DCC is the largest oil distributor in Great Britain and Northern Ireland.

See also
 List of towns and villages in Ireland

References

Towns and villages in County Laois
Townlands of County Laois